= New York Department of Transportation =

New York Department of Transportation may refer to:

- New York City Department of Transportation
- New York State Department of Transportation
